Hardy Winfred Fox, Jr. (March 29, 1945 – October 30, 2018) was an American musician. He was co-founder of the band The Residents as well as their primary composer. From 1982 to 2016 he was the president of The Cryptic Corporation. During his 44 years with The Residents, and after leaving the band in 2016, he recorded as a solo artist under many names, such as Charles Bobuck, Combo de Mechanico, Sonido de la Noche, Black Tar, and more. His newer solo albums were published by Austrian record label Klanggalerie.

History

Early life 
Hardy Winfred Fox II was born on March 29, 1945, in Longview, Texas. His parents, Hardy Wilford Fox Sr and Lillian Idell Fox, were Baptist and Methodist Christians, respectively, and so he was raised Protestant. Fox was emotionally distant from his father and took after his mother, who his future husband described as "a creative, poetic soul" who "understood him better than his father and his sisters."

He developed an interest in music at the age of 6, after hearing selections from his grandfather's jazz 78 collection. It was through this collection that he was exposed to Stan Kenton's "Artistry in Tango", as well as the music of Jimmie Lunceford and The Dorsey Brothers. His earliest experiences with playing music came from describing his nightmares to his mother by bashing on a piano, and talking in strange voices. For part of his childhood Fox's father became a missionary, and moved the family to the Southern Philippines, where a young Fox was exposed to Kulintang music, a style he would imitate for his entire career. The family later returned to Texas after his father 'lost his faith'. At the age of 18, Fox enrolled in Louisiana Tech University, where he became roommates with later Cryptic Corporation member Homer Flynn. The two bonded over their shared musical interests, and became fast friends. They graduated four years later with a major in art and a minor in business.

Pre-Residents (1969–1972) 
In 1969, Fox and Flynn moved to San Mateo, California. That same year, they began to record themselves performing strange music on a high-end two-track tape recorder he had been gifted by a Vietnam Veteran. In early 1971, Fox, now joined by other collaborators, anonymously submitted a demo tape to Harve Halverstadt at Warner Brothers Records with the hopes of being signed by the label. They received a rejection letter addressed to 'The Residents', which inspired the group to name themselves Residents Unincorporated. In 1972 Fox, along with the rest of Residents Uninc moved into a warehouse at 20 Sycamore Street in San Francisco, where they set up their first recording studio. That same year, Ralph Records, Uninc's own record label, released their first EP, featuring four songs by Residents Uninc under various pseudonyms.

The Residents (1973–2015) 

It was not until February 1973, when the group started recording their debut LP, Meet the Residents, that the group finally became 'The Residents'. According to Fox, there were no Residents before then, only a loosely bonded friendship of a few people who liked to record together. The group's first LP was not a success, only selling 40 copies within its first year of release.  In 1974 Fox began to take lessons on a Moog Modular System at Different Fur Studios, but found that it was far too technical and expensive for him. In 1976, Fox and Flynn, with fellow Louisiana natives John Kennedy and Jay Clem, formed 'The Cryptic Corporation', an organisation intended to deal with the business side of Ralph Records and The Residents. The Cryptic Corporation bought The Residents their first synthesizer, an ARP Odyssey costing $1,200 ($5,563 in 2021 money). Hardy last used the Odyssey in 2008, and sent it to composer Ego Plum in June 2018.  It was not until the release of the group's third LP, Fingerprince, that they received any mainstream attention, when a favorable review of all three of the group's LPs appeared in British music magazine Sounds. With their sudden and unexpected success, the group moved into a new studio at 444 Grove Street, San Francisco, where they would record until 1983, when John Kennedy, who owned the studio, retired as president of The Cryptic Corporation. Following Kennedy's retirement, Fox became President of The Cryptic Corporation, a role he retained until 2016.

Self-identification and early solo works (1985–2002) 
In December 1985, whilst The Residents were on their 13th Anniversary Tour, Fox's eyeball mask, which had been constructed for the cover of their 1979 album 'Eskimo', was stolen from backstage. The group decided to replace it with a skull mask, which had previously been a prop for Vileness Fats, and Third Reich 'n Roll promotional material. Because of the specific headgear, the group began to internally refer to Fox as "Dead Eye Dick", and by 1989, Mr. Skull. This was the earliest known decision which differentiated Fox from the other Residents, with his skull mask standing against the other members' eyeballs.  In 1997, Fox used the alias 'Max Steinway' on The Residents' 1997 Pollex Christi EP, where he was the credited pianist. By 1999, the mantle of Mr. Skull was taken up by a The Singing Resident, and Fox regained his unity with the other eyeballed Residents.

From 1999 to 2013, Fox recorded at least 3 solo works credited to The Residents, In Between Screams (1999), Dog Tag (2009), and Halloween (2013), all later credited to Charles Bobuck, when released on his bandcamp page.

During the 2001 Icky Flix tour, Fox began recording a solo EP, High Horses, inspired by an acid trip he had taken 31 years prior. The EP was released under the name 'Combo de Mecanico' and became Fox's first release outside of The Residents, although the identity of Combo de Mecanico remained unknown at the time. In 2002, Fox recorded his first album worth of solo material, a 30-minute suite entitled Maxine, which was released under the Bobuck name in 2012. In 2002, due to fatigue from touring, Fox had Eric Drew Feldman temporarily replace him as keyboardist on the Demons Dance Alone tour.

Charles Bobuck (2010–2016)

Talking Light (2010–2012) 
For the 2010 Talking Light tour, The Residents each became unique characters: the singer became Randy Rose; the guitarist, Bob; and Hardy, Charles 'Chuck' Bobuck. These new identities allowed The Residents to pursue solo works in a way previously un-thought of for the band, with Rose undertaking a solo show, and Hardy and Bob forming a new band, Sonidos de la Noche. Sonidos de la Noche released one album, Coochie Brake, in 2011, featuring entirely Spanish vocals. One year later, Hardy, under the Bobuck name, released his first solo album, GOD-O: Music for a Gallery Opening, through The Residents' digital store. Throughout the year, Bobuck released four more albums: CB Suite (a collection of outtakes from Coochie Brake), Codgers On The Moon, Maxine (recorded 2002), and Lying Horse Rock. 

As a companion piece to Codgers, Fox published a website of the same name. The website acted as an 18-page memoir of sorts, providing background on 'Bobuck' which had previously been unknown, such as details on his youth and equipment. Hardy would continue to create new websites for his major releases, each acting as both context for the album and additions to his memoir.

The Wonder of Weird (2013) 
The 2013 Wonder of Weird tour saw The Residents re-assume the Randy, Chuck and Bob characters. Halfway through the show, Randy would tell the audience that Chuck lived on a chicken farm with his husband, something true of both the Bobuck character and Fox. Towards the end of the tour, Fox began to experience arthritis. After surgery did not ameliorate the situation, Fox decided that the next tour would be his last. In 2013 he released his sixth solo album, Life Is My Only Sunshine.

Shadowland (2014–2015) 
The Shadowland tour began on May 2, 2014, with only seven dates planned. Fox wanted the show to represent the death of Randy, Chuck and Bob, and the rebirth of The Residents as a truly nameless band, bringing with it a drastic new direction of sound. However, designing such a drastically different sound proved too demanding on Fox, and so a show celebrating The Residents' past was instead created. The group also wished to record a new album immediately following the mini-tour; however, this was scrapped in favor of a second leg. Fox retired from The Residents in March of 2015, and was replaced by Eric Drew Feldman on all following tours.

Post-Residents (2015–2018) 
Following Fox's departure from The Residents and The Cryptic Corporation, he began to publish a bi-monthly email newsletter entitled Hacienda Bridge, starting on October 1, 2016, credited to Hardy Fox and Charles Bobuck. Starting with the March 1st 2017 issue, the newsletters began featuring a serialized novella entitled The Stone, the final chapter of which revealed that Fox and Bobuck were one and the same. Following this newsletter, the Bobuck character was retired and Fox began releasing music under his own name. Following this, he released two solo albums, one mini album, and an EP in the span of a year, before retiring completely.

Personal life 
Fox's first wife, Nessie Lessons, frequently appeared on Residents recordings from 1980 to 1983. They divorced circa 1983, when Hardy met Steven Kloman. Hardy married Kloman in 2008. He had two sisters, Diane Pasel and Linda Perez.

Illness and death 
In September 2018, he was diagnosed with glioblastoma, and announced that he was unwell, and had "something in his brain". He later added an assumed death date to his website.  On October 30, 2018, he died of brain cancer at his home in San Anselmo, California.

Studio album discography 
With The Residents

Hardy Fox performed on Residents recordings from 1972's Santa Dog to 2015's Shadow Stories, with his final writing for the group appearing on 2017's The Ghost of Hope.

Solo works 

As Hardy Fox

As Charles Bobuck

Guest appearances

As Hardy Fox 

 The Delta Nudes - Greatest Hiss (1973, released 2013) 
 KU01 - Ralph Radio Special (1981) [Interviewee]
 The Residents - Third Reich 'n Roll Hardback Book (2005) [Photography]
Bob Uck & The Family Truck - Oddities 2013-2015 (2015, released 2020) [Writing, Performance, Production, Artwork]
 The Theory Of Obscurity - A Film About The Residents (2016) [Editorial Consultant]
 Charles Bobuck - The Swords Of Slidell (2016) [Narrator]
 Charles Bobuck - Later Tonight (2016) [Executive Producer]
 Charles Bobuck - Plays The Residents (2016) [Executive Producer]
 Charles Bobuck - Thanksgiving In Bed (2016) [Illustration]
 Charles Bobuck - Nineteen-Sixty-Seven (2016) [Production, Arrangement & Performance]

As Charles Bobuck 

 The Delta Nudes - Greatest Hiss (1973, 2013)
 The Residents Present The Delta Nudes (1973, 2016)
 The Residents - Triple Dub-Ya: The Way We Were Melbourne (2005, 2012) [Remix, Editing]
 The Residents - Lonely Teenager (2011)
 Sonidos De La Noche - Coochie Brake (2011) [Keyboards]
 The Residents - The Rivers of Hades (2011) [Producer]
 Th* R*sidents - D*ck S*ab 35th Anniversary (2012) [Illustration]
 The Residents - Bad Day On The Midway (Music From The Game Reconsidered) (2012) [Contraption]
 The Residents - Mush-Room (2013) [Contraption]
 The Residents - Radio Thoreau Download Series  (2013 - 2014) [Fix]
 The Residents - The Wonder of Weird (2014)

Under other pseudonyms 

 The Residents - Pollex Christi EP (1997) [Piano & Production, as Max Steinway]
 Combo de Mecanico - High Horses EP (2001)
 The Residents - Commercial Album DVD (2004) [Interface Design And Blue Movies, as Sami Selmo]
 The Residents – The Rivers Of Hades (2011) [Package Assembly, as Sammi Selmo]
 Sonidos De La Noche - Coochie Brake (2011) [Package Design, as Sammi Selmo]
 Charles Bobuck - Lying Horse Rock (2012) [Package Design, as Sammi Selmo]
 Charles Bobuck - GOD O: Music For A Gallery Opening (2012) [CD Cover & Package, as Sammi Selmo]
 Charles Bobuck – Maxine (2012) [Image, as Sammi Selmo]

Instrumental Residents projects 
Residents projects believed to be uncredited Fox solo works

 4 Daze (1981, released 2017. Collaboration with Renaldo & The Loaf)
 For Elsie (1987) 
 Hunters (1995)
 Pollex Christi EP (1997)
 The Original Disfigured Night Arrangement EP (1997, released 2009)
 Scattered Unfinished Music Sketches (1997, released 2009)
 I Murdered Mommy (1998, released 2004, Mini-album)
 Night of The Hunters (2005)
 Animal Lover Instrumental (2005, released 2008)
 Music To Eat Bricks By (2006, released 2019)
 The River of Crime! Instrumental (2006, released 2008)
 Tabasco (2006, released 2010)
 Voice-Less Midnight (2007, released 2010)
 Strange Culture / Haeckel's Tale (2007, released 2010)
 Smell My Picture (2008)
 Postcards from Patmos (2008)
 Hades (2009)
 Ozan EP (2010)
 Chicken Scratching with The Residents (2010, Mini-Album)
 Dollar General (One Lost Night In Van Horn, Texas) (2010)
 Chuck's Ghost Music (2011)
 Bad Day On The Midway (Music From The Game Reconsidered) (2012)
 Mush-Room (2013)

Bibliography

as Charles Bobuck 
 (2016) THIS

as Hardy Fox 
 (2017) The Swords of Slidell
 (2017) Wallpaper
 (2017) The Stone

References

External links 
Official website
Hacienda Bridge newsletters
 Andy Beta, "The Man in the Eyeball Mask", Texas Monthly, February 2022

1945 births
2018 deaths
20th-century American male musicians
20th-century American LGBT people
21st-century American male musicians
21st-century American LGBT people
American avant-garde musicians
Bisexual men
Bisexual musicians
Deaths from brain cancer in the United States
Deaths from cancer in California
American LGBT musicians
Musicians from Texas
People from Longview, Texas
Louisiana Tech University alumni
The Residents